Bara Mamadou Lamine Ndiaye (born 31 December 1991, in Tivaouane) commonly known as Bara Bebeto or just Bebeto, is a Senegalese football player who currently plays for Turkish club Ceyhanspor.

Career
The former street vendor started his football career 2008 in Italy with Teramo Calcio, who made his senior debut in the 2009/2010 season of the Eccellenza.

After a half year with the senior side of Teramo Calcio left in February 2010 and joined to Serie C1 club Giulianova Calcio.

FC Lugano 
In September 2011 signed for Swiss Challenge League team FC Lugano and played his debut on 23. October 2011 against FC Wil 1900.

Kaposvári Rákóczi FC 
On 20 February 2012 was loaned out to the Kaposvári Rákóczi FC and played his debut on 3 March 2012 against Videoton FC. N'diaye scored his first goal in the Nemzeti Bajnokság I on 24 March 2012 in his third match for Kaposvári Rákóczi FC against BFC Siófok.

References

External links
 

1991 births
Living people
Senegalese footballers
Serer sportspeople
Association football forwards
Giulianova Calcio players
FC Lugano players
Kaposvári Rákóczi FC players
Kecskeméti TE players
Nemzeti Bajnokság I players
Senegalese expatriate footballers
Expatriate footballers in Italy
Expatriate footballers in Switzerland
Expatriate footballers in Hungary
Senegalese expatriate sportspeople in Italy
Senegalese expatriate sportspeople in Switzerland
Senegalese expatriate sportspeople in Hungary